The 2019 Stephen F. Austin football team represented Stephen F. Austin State University in the 2019 NCAA Division I FCS football season as a member of the Southland Conference. The Lumberjacks wereled by first-year head coach Colby Carthel and played their home games at Homer Bryce Stadium.

Previous season
The Lumberjacks finished the 2018 season with a 2–8 overall record, and a 2–7 in Southland play to finish in tenth place.

Preseason

Preseason poll
The Southland Conference released their preseason poll on July 18, 2019. The Lumberjacks were picked to finish in ninth place.

Preseason All–Southland Teams
The Lumberjacks placed three players on the preseason all–Southland teams.

Offense

1st team

Storm Ruiz – K

2nd team

Tamrick Pace – WR

Defense

2nd team

Alize Ward – DB

Schedule

Source:

Game summaries

at Baylor

Tarleton State

at Southern Utah

Nicholls

at Lamar

vs. Sam Houston State

at Abilene Christian

McNeese State

at Southeastern Louisiana

Incarnate Word

at Central Arkansas

at Northwestern State

References

Stephen F. Austin
Stephen F. Austin Lumberjacks football seasons
Stephen F. Austin Lumberjacks football